Antonín Rezek (13 January 1853 in Jindřichův Hradec – 4 February 1909 in Prague) was a renowned Czech political historian, specialized in political and religious history of the 16th to 18th century.

Life 
Son of a renowned watchmaker, Rezek graduated 1875 at Charles University in Prague, where he became professor of general history in 1883. In the years 1900–1903 he was minister of the Imperial Austrian government in Vienna. He published numerous popular articles and works, edited many documents from the archives and reedited several Czech chronicles from the 17th century. His works excel in perfect documentation and detailed knowledge of the matter.

Works
 Dějiny Čech a Moravy nové doby I., II. (1893)
 Dějiny vlády Ferdinanda I. v Čechách

Sources
 JIROUŠEK, Bohumil. Antonín Rezek. České Budějovice: Jihočeská univerzita 2002. . (Czech)

1853 births
1909 deaths
19th-century Czech historians
20th-century Czech historians
Academic staff of Charles University